Peter Dempsey (Kiltullagh) was a tenant farmer who was murdered during the Irish Land War on 28 May 1881. He was shot dead while walking to Mass with his two daughters across a field mass path.

Dempsey had taken over an  holding near Hollypark, Loughrea after the previous tenant, Murty Hynes, had given it up following a speech by Matt Harris. Hynes relinquished the holdings in September 1880 after Harris, who was a Fenian, Land Leaguer, Irish nationalist and Westminster MP, condemned him in a speech for taking a farm after the previous occupant (Martin Bermingham) had been evicted for non-payment of rent. Dempsey refused to leave the farm and was killed. Two men were charged with murder and were acquitted. Few attended Dempsey's funeral.

See also

 Martin O'Halloran
 James Connors (Kiltullagh)
 John Henry Blake
 Thomas Henry Burke (civil servant)
 Hubert de Burgh-Canning, 2nd Marquess of Clanricarde

Sources

 The Land War in South East Galway (1879-1891), a thesis by Anne Finnegan
 As The Centuries Passed: A History of Kiltullagh 1500–1900, edited Kieran Jordan, 2000
 The Land Wars, Kevin and Kieran Jordan, in op.cit.
 The District of Loughrea: Vol. I History 1791-1918.

References

Irish murder victims
People from County Galway
19th-century Irish people